New Enterprise Public School is a historic school building located at South Woodbury Township in Bedford County, Pennsylvania. It was built in 1881, and is a two-story brick building, three-bays wide and four bays deep.  It measures 28 feet, 2 inches, by 42 feet, 2 inches.  It sits on a cut coursed stone foundation.  It features a circular cartwheel window on the front gable and a wood frame bell tower.

It was listed on the National Register of Historic Places in 1981.

References 

School buildings on the National Register of Historic Places in Pennsylvania
School buildings completed in 1881
Buildings and structures in Bedford County, Pennsylvania
National Register of Historic Places in Bedford County, Pennsylvania
1881 establishments in Pennsylvania